The siege of Braničevo was laid by Hungarian king Géza II against Byzantine-held Braničevo in late 1154.

Background
Emperor Manuel's cousin, Andronikos Komnenos, who administered Belgrade, Braničevo, and Niš sent a letter to Géza II in 1154, offering to hand over those towns to him in exchange for his support against the emperor. Géza II sent his envoys to Sicily to sign a new alliance with William I of Sicily around the end of the year, but William I was fighting with his rebellious subjects.

Siege
Géza II was aided by Cumans, who had been raiding the Danube at the time. As a Hungarian vassal, Borić, the ban of Bosnia took part in the attack, alongside a Bohemian detachment. Braničevo was besieged and the surroundings were ravaged. After hearing of the imprisonment of Andronikos, Géza II abandoned the siege and returned for Hungary.

Aftermath
Manuel answered by dispatching troops towards the battlefield. Through Serdica (Sofia) and Niš, Manuel arrived in the Smilis province near Paraćin where he set up camp. The Hungarian Army retreated towards Belgrade. The pursuing Byzantine troops, under general Basil Tzintzilukes, entered into battle with them, but the Byzantines were annihilated before the Hungarians returned to Hungary.

In early 1155, the Byzantine and Hungarian envoys signed a new peace treaty. In the same year, a Byzantine army expelled Géza II's ally, Desa, from Serbia and restored Uroš II who had promised that he would not enter into an alliance with Hungary.

See also
Battle of Sirmium (1167)

References

Sources

Further reading

1154 in Europe
Braničevo
12th century in Serbia
Branicevo
Branicevo
Braničevo
Braničevo
1150s in the Byzantine Empire
Braničevo